James M. Yeakel was an American politician who served as mayor of Bethlehem, Pennsylvania for eight years between 1922 and 1930. Before entering politics Yeakel worked as a Coachbuilder.

Mayor of Bethlehem

As mayor Yeakel focused his efforts on improving the city's infrastructure and services. Namely supplying clean water to city residents, ensuring sufficient fire protection and developing more land that had been previously unusable in the city's southside. As mayor he also oversaw the construction of the Hill to Hill Bridge connecting the two halves of the city. Additionally during his time as mayor the city's newspapers the Daily Times and the Globe merged to form the Bethlehem Globe-Times which is now known as The Express-Times. However, Mayor Yeakel is most infamously for his inaction as Bethlehem became known as a resort town for New Yorkers to come and commit various vices that where illegal at the time due to Prohibition. Gambling dens, brothels, and Speakeasies where commonplace in the city's southside. On November 12, 1927, officer Charles Fenton was shot and killed attempting to apprehend a robbery suspect from one of the south side's 35 brothels. His death sparked massive outcry for the city government to step in and restore law and order. Mayor Yeakel seemed disinterested at best with the growing issue of crime and violence in the city's south side. This would result in his defeat in his re-election campaign in 1930 to Robert Pfeifle who ran on a tough on crime platform.

References

Mayors of Bethlehem, Pennsylvania
Year of death unknown